Interstate 85 (I-85) is a part of the Interstate Highway System that runs from Montgomery, Alabama, to Petersburg, Virginia. In Virginia, the Interstate Highway runs  from the North Carolina state line near Bracey north to I-95 in Petersburg. I-85 passes through the eastern part of Southside, where it parallels US Route 1 (US 1) from Petersburg, where the highway runs concurrently with US 460, to south of South Hill, where the highway intersects Southside's major east–west highway, US 58. The Interstate Highway is the primary connection between the Greater Richmond Region and Research Triangle and other major metropolitan areas of North Carolina. Like all mainline Interstate Highways, I-85 is a part of the National Highway System for its entire length in Virginia.

Route description
I-85 enters Virginia in Mecklenburg County southwest of Bracey. The Interstate Highway continues southwest toward Henderson and Durham. Northbound I-85 has a welcome center before the highway crosses Lake Gaston, an impoundment of the Roanoke River, on a causeway and bridge before reaching an interchange with State Route 903 (SR 903) at Bracey. The freeway passes through the town of South Hill, where the highway has a cloverleaf interchange with US 58 (Atlantic Avenue).  US 58 serves as the major east–west highway of Southside; the US Route provides access to La Crosse, Brodnax, Lawrenceville, and Emporia to the east and Boydton and Clarksville to the west. US 58 leads to SR 47, which provides access to Chase City. North of the town of South Hill, I-85 has a junction with US 1 (Mecklenburg Avenue), which parallels the Interstate Highway from Henderson to Petersburg. The US 1 interchange also provides access to SR 138, which heads north toward Kenbridge.

North of US 1, I-85 enters Brunswick County just before the highway crosses the Meherrin River. The Interstate Highway has an interchange with SR 644 (Brunswick Drive) at Meredithville and a partial interchange with SR 46 (Christanna Highway) before the freeway crosses to the east side of US 1 (Boydton Plank Road) at an interchange southwest of the town of Alberta. The SR 46 and US 1 interchanges provide access to St. Paul's College in Lawrenceville and the Christanna campus of Southside Virginia Community College at the US 1/SR 46 intersection. Northeast of Alberta, I-85 has rest areas in both directions and interchanges with SR 630 (Sturgeon Road) at Sturgeonville and SR 712 (Old Stage Road) near Rawlings.

I-85 crosses the Nottoway River into Dinwiddie County southwest of its interchanges with SR 40 (McKenney Highway) near the town of McKenney and SR 650 (Hamilton Arms Road) at DeWitt. The Interstate Highway serves Dinwiddie via its partial cloverleaf interchange with SR 703 (Carson Road) just east of the county seat of Dinwiddie County and another pair of rest areas. The Dinwiddie interchange and the following interchange with US 460 (Cox Road) provide access to Virginia Motorsports Park. At the partial cloverleaf interchange with US 460, which also leads to Dinwiddie County Airport, the Interstate Highway and US Route start to run concurrently toward Petersburg. Both the US 460 interchange and the following partial cloverleaf junction with US 1 (Boydton Plank Road) provide access to the National Museum of the Civil War Soldier at Pamplin Historical Park. East of US 1, the freeway curves to the east and changes from having a wide, forested median to a Jersey barrier separating the twin carriageways.

I-85 enters the city of Petersburg prior to its junction with Squirrel Level Road. South of downtown Petersburg, I-85 reaches its northern terminus at a trumpet interchange with I-95. The southern end of the interchange has a ramp from northbound I-85 to southbound I-95. Here, US 460 joins I-95 south through an interchange with US 301 (Crater Road), south of which the US Route separates from I-95 on its way to Norfolk. I-85 curves north and merges with I-95 in the direction of Richmond adjacent to the loop ramp from northbound I-95 to southbound I-85. Just before merging with northbound I-95, I-85 has its final exit, a ramp that leads to the one-way pair of eastbound Wythe Street and westbound Washington Street in Historic Old Towne Petersburg.  Wythe Street leads to Petersburg National Battlefield; Fort Lee, which contains the US Army Quartermaster Museum and US Army Women's Museum; and the city of Hopewell via SR 36.

History

Exit list

References

External links

Virginia Highways Project: I-85
Roads to the Future: I-85
Virginia at AARoads: Interstate 85 north and Interstate 85 south

85
 Virginia
Interstate 085
Interstate 085
Interstate 085
Interstate 085